Lucía Gutiérrez Puerta, known by her stage name Lucía Guilmáin (January 5, 1938 – February 15, 2021), was a Mexican actress.

Biography
Her career was between 1965 and 2016 She worked in theater, movies, and television. Guilmáin was known for her roles in Las fuerzas vivas (1975), Length of War (1976) and Darker Than Night (2014).

Lucía Gutiérrez Puerta was born in Mexico City on January 5, 1938. She was married to the commentator Raúl Orvañanos, with whom she had a son. Guilmáin died on February 15, 2021, in Mexico City, aged 83, from COVID-19.

References

External links
 

1938 births
2021 deaths
Mexican film actresses
Mexican television actresses
Mexican stage actresses
Mexican voice actresses
Actors from Mexico City
Deaths from the COVID-19 pandemic in Mexico